The Biodefense and Pandemic Vaccine and Drug Development Act of 2005, nicknamed "Bioshield Two" and sponsored by Senator Richard Burr (R-North Carolina), aims to shorten the pharmaceutical development process for new vaccines and drugs in case of a pandemic, and to protect vaccine makers and the pharmaceutical industry from legal liability for vaccine injuries.  The proposed bill would create a new federal agency, the Biomedical Advanced Research and Development Agency (BARDA), that would act "as the single point of authority" to promote advanced research and development of drugs and vaccines in response to bioterrorism and natural disease outbreaks, while shielding the agency from public Freedom of Information Act (FOIA) requests.  BARDA would be exempt from long-standing open records and meetings laws that apply to most government departments.

The Senate Health, Education, Labor, and Pensions Committee approved the bill, co-sponsored by Bill Frist (R-TN), Mike Enzi (R-WY), and Judd Gregg (R-NH), by voice vote, despite Democratic objections.

Several other proposals have contained, in part, similar provisions (or protections) as those found in the Biodefense and Pandemic Vaccine and Drug Development Act of 2005.

Key provisions

The Bioshield Two bill would shift the main responsibility for developing bioterrorism countermeasures out of the Department of Homeland Security and into the new BARDA agency within the Department of Health and Human Services.  The proposed new agency would improve on Project BioShield, a barely two-year-old program also meant to encourage the production of vaccines and drugs.

BARDA would receive a first-year budget of $1 billion.  Other key aspects of the proposed legislation include:

 Provision of rebates or grants as incentives for domestic manufacturing of vaccines and medical countermeasures against bioterrorism and natural disease outbreaks. 
 Liability protections for drug makers that develop vaccines for biological weapons.  The measure would make manufacturers, distributors, health care providers, or administrators of security countermeasures immune from liability caused by a security countermeasure or any pandemic/epidemic product, by means of a limited antitrust exemption.
 Establishment of a single agency, the Biomedical Advanced Research and Development Agency, as the lead federal agency for the development of countermeasures against bioterrorism.  The new agency would report directly to the Secretary of Health and Human Services, which would have sole authority to decide whether a manufacturer violated laws mandating drug safety.  Citizens would be banned from challenging such decisions in the civil court system.  The agency would 'partner' with drug makers while placing information about such partnerships outside of public view.
 Extension of some prescription drug patents.
 Allow the Department of Health and Human Services to sign exclusive sales contracts with particular manufacturers for a particular product.
 Forbid government purchases of generic versions of such new drugs or vaccines as well as public sales of the products for use as countermeasures.
 Exempt countermeasures from certain federal cost oversight requirements.

Support
Much of the support for the bill comes from Pharmaceutical Research and Manufacturers of America (PhRMA) and its members. In the 2002 election cycle, PhRMA contributed $3,505,052 to politicians, with 95% going to Republicans. The top recipient in the Senate was the bill's sponsor, Senator Richard Burr, who received $288,684, according to the non-partisan OpenSecrets.

Senator Burr said the legislation "creates a true partnership" between the federal government, the pharmaceutical industry and academia to "walk the drug companies through the Valley of Death" in bringing a new vaccine or drug to market.

Exemptions from open records and meetings laws would streamline the development process, safeguard national security and protect the proprietary interests of drug companies, say Republican backers of the bill.

Opposition
Senator Chris Dodd (D-Connecticut) said "Their plan will protect companies that make ineffective or harmful medicines, and because it does not include compensation for those injured by a vaccine or drug, it will discourage first responders and patients from taking medicines to counter a biological attack or disease outbreak."

See also
 Pandemic and All-Hazards Preparedness Act −, a similar bill
 Public Readiness and Emergency Preparedness Act, a similar bill
 List of vaccine topics

References

External links
 LasVegasSun.com – 'GOP Wants to Create Secretive Gov't Agency', Andrew Bridges, Associated Press (December 2, 2005)
 FEMA.gov – 'Senate Committee Approves Legislation to Promote Bio-Defense Projects', David Ruppe, Global Security Newswire (October 19, 2005)

Proposed legislation of the 109th United States Congress
United States proposed federal health legislation
Vaccination law
Disaster preparedness in the United States
Vaccination in the United States